The 2022 United States House of Representatives elections in Louisiana were held on November 8, 2022, to elect the six U.S. representatives from the state of Louisiana, one from each of the state's six congressional districts. The elections coincided with other elections to the House of Representatives, elections to the United States Senate and various state and local elections.

District 1

The 1st district is based in the suburbs of New Orleans, spanning from the northern shore of Lake Pontchartrain south to the Mississippi River delta. The incumbent is Republican Steve Scalise, who was re-elected with 72.2% of the vote in 2020.

Candidates

Declared
Katie Darling (Democratic), businesswoman
Howard Kearney (Libertarian), computer programmer and candidate for this district in 2016 and 2020
Steve Scalise (Republican), incumbent U.S. Representative and House Minority Whip

General election

Predictions

Results

District 2

The 2nd district stretches from New Orleans to inner Baton Rouge. Democrat Cedric Richmond, who was re-elected with 63.6% of the vote in 2020, resigned on January 15, 2021, to become the director of the White House Office of Public Engagement. Democrat Troy Carter won the 2021 special election in a runoff with 55.2% of the vote.

Candidates

Declared
Troy Carter (Democratic), incumbent U.S. Representative
Dan Lux (Republican), entertainment producer

Endorsements

General election

Predictions

Results

District 3

The 3rd district encompasses southwestern Louisiana, taking in Lake Charles and Lafayette. The incumbent is Republican Clay Higgins, who was re-elected with 67.8% of the vote in 2020.

Candidates

Declared
Clay Higgins (Republican), incumbent U.S. Representative
Holden Hoggatt (Republican), prosecutor
Lessie Olivia Leblanc (Democratic), journalist
Tia LeBrun (Democratic), teacher 
Guy McLendon (Libertarian), perennial candidate
Thomas "Lane" Payne, Jr. (Republican), pastor
Jacob "Jake" Shaheen (Republican), teacher
Gloria R. Wiggins (Independent)

Withdrawn
Dustin Granger (Democratic)

Endorsements

General election

Predictions

Polling

Results

District 4

The 4th district encompasses northwestern Louisiana, taking in the Shreveport–Bossier City metropolitan area. The incumbent is Republican Mike Johnson, who was re-elected with 60.4% of the vote in 2020.

Candidates

Declared
Mike Johnson (Republican), incumbent U.S. Representative and Vice Chair of the House Republican Conference

Endorsements

General election

Predictions

Results

District 5

The 5th district encompasses rural northeastern Louisiana, central Louisiana, as well as the northern part of Louisiana's Florida parishes in southeast Louisiana, taking in Monroe, Alexandria, Opelousas, Amite and Bogalusa, Louisiana. Republican Luke Letlow, who was elected in a runoff with 62.0% of the vote, died on December 29, 2020, of COVID-19 before he took office. Letlow's widow Julia won the 2021 special election with 64.9% of the vote.

Candidates

Declared
Oscar "Omar" Dantzler (Democratic), candidate for governor in 2019
Allen Guillory (Republican), perennial candidate 
Walter Earl Huff (Democratic), businessman
Julia Letlow (Republican), incumbent U.S. Representative
Hunter Pullen (Republican), U.S. Army veteran

Endorsements

General election

Predictions

Results

District 6

The 6th district encompasses the suburbs of Baton Rouge. The incumbent is Republican Garret Graves, who was re-elected with 71.0% of the vote in 2020.

Candidates

Declared
Brian Belzer (Republican), businessman
Rufus Holt Craig (Libertarian), former chair of the Louisiana Libertarian Party and perennial candidate 
Garret Graves (Republican), incumbent U.S. Representative

Endorsements

General election

Predictions

Results

Notes

Partisan clients

References

External links
Official campaign websites for 1st district candidates
Katie Darling (D) for Congress
Howard Kearney (L) for Congress
Steve Scalise (R) for Congress

Official campaign websites for 2nd district candidates
Troy Carter (D) for Congress
Dan Lux (R) for Congress

Official campaign websites for 3rd district candidates
Clay Higgins (R) for Congress
Holden Hoggatt (R) for Congress
Tia LeBrun (D) for Congress
Lane Payne (R) for Congress
Jacob Shaheen (R) for Congress

Official campaign websites for 4th district candidates
Mike Johnson (R) for Congress

Official campaign websites for 5th district candidates
 Julia Letlow (R) for Congress

Official campaign websites for 6th district candidates
Brian Belzer (R) for Congress
Garret Graves (R) for Congress

2022
Louisiana
United States House of Representatives